Ravindra Kumar Ramavath is an Indian politician from Telangana belonging to  Telangana Rashtra Samithi. He is representing Devarakonda Assembly constituency.

Early life and education 
He was born in Sheripally village near Devarakonda in Nalgonda district in a Lambadi caste. He holds LLB and MA degrees.

Political career
As a CPI candidate from Devarakonda Ravindra Kumar contested 2004 Andhra Pradesh Legislative Assembly election. He was elected as MLA for the first time by defeating nearest rival from TDP. In 2014 he won for a second time as an MLA from CPI. He was the only MLA from CPI in Telangana Assembly and subsequently he is the floor leader of CPI in the Telangana Assembly. Later he changed into TRS party.

References

Living people
People from Nalgonda district
Telangana politicians
Communist Party of India politicians from Telangana
Telugu politicians
Telangana MLAs 2014–2018
Year of birth missing (living people)